NamPost is the  national postal service of Namibia. It  has 743 employees and reserves of N$ 2.51 million. The current CEO of NamPost is Festus Hangula.

History

The first postal services in then South West Africa started in 1814 with the deployment of messengers facilitating communication between the early mission stations at Warmbad and Bethanie and later to Keetmanshoop and Gross Barmen. This service was expanded in 1846, connecting the South West African mission stations to those in South Africa.

The first post office of South West Africa was founded in Otjimbingwe in 1888, with more offices being established in Windhoek in 1891 and Swakopmund in 1895. In 1992, NamPost was founded, managing 92 post offices in Namibia. In 2012, this number had risen to 135.

See also
South African Post Office

References

External links 
 Official site

Companies of Namibia
Postal organizations
Postal system of Namibia
Postal history of Namibia